Sigurd Christiansen (17 November 1891 – 23 October 1947) was a Norwegian novelist and playwright. He made his literary debut with the novel Seieren in 1915.

His literary breakthrough was the trilogy Indgangen (1925), Sverdene (1927) and Riket (1929).

His novel To levende og en død (1931) won first prize in a competition, and was later made into three films: Norwegian, Czechoslovak and British-Swedish.

Christiansen was awarded Gyldendal's Endowment in 1940.

He was born and died in Drammen, Norway.

Works 

 Seieren (1915)
 Thomas Hergel (1917)
 Vort eget liv (1918)
 Offerdøden : skuespil i fire akter (1919)
 Døperen (1921)
 Blodet (1923)
 Indgangen (1925)
 Edmund Jahr (1926)
 Sverdene (1927)
 Riket (1929)
 To levende og en død (1931)
 En reise i natten (1931)
 Dydens have (1932)
 Agner i stormen (1933)
 Drømmen og livet (1935) (trilogy Jørgen Wendt 1)
 Det ensomme hjerte (1938)  (trilogy Jørgen Wendt 2)
 Mannen fra bensinstasjonen (1941)
 Menneskenes lodd (1945)  (trilogy Jørgen Wendt 3)

References

External links
 

1891 births
1947 deaths
20th-century Norwegian novelists
20th-century Norwegian dramatists and playwrights
Norwegian male dramatists and playwrights